Caenocara tenuipalpum is a species of desert cockroach in the beetle family Ptinidae. It is found in North America.

References

Further reading

 
 

Ptinidae
Articles created by Qbugbot
Beetles described in 1905